The Corossol structure, which is also known as the Corossol crater, is a circular,  in diameter, underwater bedrock feature that is exposed on the gulf floor of the northwestern Gulf of Saint Lawrence  offshore of the city of Sept-Îles, Quebec in eastern Canada. It is hypothesized to be a possible pre-Pleistocene, extraterrestrial impact structure. This underwater feature was found during the study of high-resolution bathymetric and sub-bottom profiler data collected south of the city of Sept-Iles in the northwestern Gulf of Saint Lawrence.

Geology 
In addition, three concentric rings form narrow ( wide), shallow, and discontinuous depressions around the central cavity.

The central uplift, associated central cavity, brim, and rings likely represent both deformation and differential erosion of sedimentary rocks of the Ordovician Saint. Lawrence Platform. The sedimentary strata surrounding the Corossol structure show no deformation. These faults also are associated with the concentric rings and form the irregular topography of the structure's brim.

These sediments consist of glaciomarine and postglacial sediments. The discontinuous nature of the rings results from either partial burial of the rings under these sediments or partial erosion of the rings.

Geomorphology 
The gulf bottom surrounding the Corossol structure is characterized by a relict cuesta landscape consisting of  partially eroded, gently inclined sedimentary rock layers that decreases southwards into a flat topography. The cuestas consist of steep northward-facing scarps and gentle southward-dipping slopes. The cuestas and associated paleovalleys likely were created by fluvial erosion during regional sea-level lowstand(s) that likely predates Quaternary glaciations. The passage of the Laurentide Ice Sheet formed the streamlined glacial lineations that cut across the southern half of the Corossol structure. The orientation of these lineations indicate SE–SSE-directed ice flow that scoured the surface of the Corossol structure.

Origin 
It is proposed that the Corossol structure was created as a result of the impact of a meteorite of about 300 metres (980 ft) in diameter. The impact origin of the Corossol structure is indicated by its associated geology, faulting, fracturing, and a rock fragment recovered from the crater surface. This rock fragment exhibits, under the microscope, impact melt and shock-induced structures.

Age 
The precise, absolute age of the Corossol structure remains undetermined. It geological setting and cross-cutting relationships indicate that it was created long after the Middle Ordovician (470 million years ago) and before the accumulation of glacial till and creation of streamlined lineations, which are interpreted as subglacially produced mega-scale glacial lineations, on its surface. The relict cuestas and evidence of fluvial erosion observed on the outer walls of the structure, imply it was formed during one of the periods of regional lowstand of sea level prior to the Quaternary glaciations.

In 2013, it was stated that the Corossol structure is related to a proposed impact event that is hypothesized to have taken place at the start of the Younger Dryas Episode and it supports the hypothesis that a meteorite impact triggered this cooling episode. A later paper argues that their interpretation is based on the misreading of preliminary results, including a radiocarbon date, published in a conference abstract. Later papers conclude on the basis of regional studies and the presence of till and glacial lineations cutting across the Corossol structure that the radiocarbon date only indicates that it was formed before deglaciation, which occurred approximately 12.7 and 12.4 cal. ka BP. Furthermore, the conference abstract did not take into account the fluvial erosion of the cuestas which support a Pre-Quaternary, possibly Paleogene or older, age for the Corossol structure. As a result, it was concluded that this structure has never been "provisionally dated to 12.9 cal. ka BP" as stated in 2013.

See also 
 Bloody Creek crater
 Charity Shoal crater

References

External links 
Bouchard, Jean-François, 2013, Une météorite serait à l’origine du cratère du Corossol Une découverte importante au large de Sept-Îles. UQAR-Info.
Bureau des affaires publiques, 2013, *Découverte scientifique d’envergure pour Michael Higgins et son équipe. Université du Québec à Chicoutimi, November 7, 2013
Dorais, R. 2014, The Corossol Crater's Origins Are Slowly Revealed. Infoceans Quebec Bulletin. vol. 16, no. 6, December 2013
Higgins, M.D., P. Lajeunesse, G. St-Onge, J. Locat, R. Sanfacon, and M.J. Duchesne, 2014, The Submarine 4-km diameter Corossol Crater, Eastern Canada: Evidence for an impact origin. Geophysical Research Abstracts. vol. 16, p. EGU2014-4190.
 Documentation of the Corossol crater structure

Impact craters of Quebec
Possible impact craters on Earth